Kaga (also , Kaẓ̌a or Kazha) is a village in Khogyani District, Nangarhar Province, Afghanistan. The town is located within the heartland of the Khogyani tribe of Pashtuns. It is the primary market-town and capital of the district.

See also 
Nangarhar Province

References

Populated places in Nangarhar Province